The Essential Journey is a compilation of songs from the rock band Journey. Released on October 16, 2001, it is part of Sony BMG's "Essential" series of compilation albums. The album includes most of Journey's major and minor hits that have charted on Billboard Hot 100. It covers material recorded while Steve Perry was lead singer of the band, from 1978's Infinity to 1996's Trial by Fire, neglecting Journey albums recorded before and after his membership. The first disc is Greatest Hits with some minor changes: tracks are in a slightly different order, "After the Fall" replaces "Be Good to Yourself" (which is on the second disc instead), and "When You Love a Woman" is included (this song was recorded after the release of the original edition of Greatest Hits, but was added to the 2006 CD edition).

The Essential Journey was certified as Platinum in the United States on February 2, 2005 and Double Platinum in the United States  on March 3, 2016.  It had sold 1,156,000 copies in the US as of August 2013.

Track listing

Personnel 
Steve Perry – lead vocals
Neal Schon – electric and acoustic guitars, backing vocals
Gregg Rolie – keyboards, backing and co-lead vocals 
Ross Valory – bass guitar, backing vocals
Jonathan Cain – keyboards, rhythm guitar, backing vocals
Ross Valory – bass, backing vocals
Steve Smith – drums, percussion
Additional Musicians
Randy Jackson - bass guitar on "After the Fall"

Charts

References 

Journey (band) compilation albums
2001 greatest hits albums
Columbia Records compilation albums
Sony Records compilation albums
Legacy Recordings compilation albums
Albums produced by Mike Stone (record producer)
Albums produced by Kevin Elson
Albums produced by Roy Thomas Baker
Albums produced by David Foster
Albums produced by Jonathan Cain
Albums produced by Kevin Shirley